Asperdaphne recticostulata is an extinct species of sea snail, a marine gastropod mollusk in the family Raphitomidae.

Distribution
Fossils of this marine species have been found in Pleistocene strata of the Chiba formation in Japan.

References

 Yokoyama, M., 1922a: Fossils from the upper Musashino of Kazusa and Shimosa. Journal of the College of Science, Imperial University of Tokyo, vol. 44, art. 1, pp. 1–200 + i–viii, pls. 1–17
 Taki, I. and Oyama, K., 1954: Matajiro Yokoyama's the Pliocene and later faunas from the Kwanto region in Japan. Palaeontological Society of Japan, Special Papers, no. 2, pp. 1–68, pls. 1–49
 Oyama, K., 1973: Revision of Matajiro Yokoyama's type Mollusca from the Tertiary and Quaternary of the Kanto area. Palaeontological Society of Japan, Special Papers, no. 17, pp. 1–148, pls. 1–57

External links
 University Museum, University of Tokyo: Asperdaphne recticostulata

recticostulata
Gastropods described in 1922